Spiridens is a genus of mosses belonging to the family Hypnodendraceae.

The species of this genus are found in Southeastern Asia and Australia.

Species:
 Spiridens abietinus (Hook.) Mitt. 
 Spiridens aristifolius Mitten, 1868

References

Bryopsida
Moss genera